Pasay Voyagers are a professional basketball team competing in the Maharlika Pilipinas Basketball League (MPBL) and the Chooks-to-Go Pilipinas 3x3.

Current Roster

Head coaches

Depth chart

All-time roster

 Roberto Bartolo (2018)
 Jaypee Belencion (2018)
 Julius Cadavis (2018)
 Jan Jamon (2018)
 Ron Lastimosa (2018)

Season-by-season records
Records from the 2018–19 MPBL season:

References

2018 establishments in the Philippines
Basketball teams established in 2018
Maharlika Pilipinas Basketball League teams
Chooks-to-Go Pilipinas 3x3 teams